Nettapakkam is one of five communes in the Pondicherry district in the Indian territory of Puducherry. Nettapakkam is under the Bahour taluk of Puducherry.

Panchayat villages
The following are 11 panchayat villages under the Netapakkam Commune, viz.

References

External links
 Department of Revenue and Disaster Management, Government of Puducherry

Communes of Pondicherry